Inbox by Gmail was an email service developed by Google. Announced in limited invitation-only basis on October 22, 2014, it was officially released to the public on May 28, 2015. Inbox was shut down by Google on April 2, 2019.

Available on the web, and through mobile apps for Android and iOS, Inbox by Gmail aimed to improve email productivity and organization through several key features. Bundles gathered emails of the same topic together, highlights surface key details from messages, and reminders, assists, and snooze functionality enabled users to control when specific information appears. Updates to the service enabled an undo send feature, a "Smart Reply" feature that automatically generates short reply examples for certain emails, integration with Google Calendar for event organization, previews of newsletters, and a "Save to Inbox" feature that lets users save links for later use.

Inbox by Gmail received generally positive reviews. At its launch, it was called "minimalist and lovely, full of layers and easy to navigate". Its features were deemed helpful in finding the right messages, and one reviewer noted that the service "feels a lot like the future of email". However, it also received criticism, particularly for a low density of information, algorithms that needed tweaking, and that the service required users to "give up the control" on organizing their own email, meaning that "Anyone who already has a system for organizing their emails will likely find themselves fighting Google's system". Google noted in March 2016 that 10% of all replies on mobile originated from Inbox's Smart Reply feature.

Google discontinued the service in March 2019.

Features 
Inbox by Gmail scans the user's incoming Gmail messages for information. It gathers email messages related to the same overall topic to an organized bundle with a title describing the bundle's content. For example, flight tickets, car rentals, and hotel reservations are grouped to "Travel", giving the user an easier overview of emails. Users can also manually group emails together in order to "teach" Inbox how the user works. The service highlights key details and important information in messages, such as flight itineraries, event information, and photos and documents. Additionally, Inbox can retrieve updated information from the Internet, including real-time status of flights and package deliveries. Users can set reminders to surface important messages at a later time. At times when a user needs particular information, Inbox can assist the user by surfacing the needed details. For those times when Inbox highlights information not needed at the time, users can snooze a message or reminder, with options to make the info reappear at a later time or at a specific location.

In June 2015, Google added an "Undo Send" feature to Inbox, giving users 10 seconds to undo sending a message.

In November 2015, Google added "Smart Reply" functionality to the mobile apps. With Smart Reply, Inbox determines which emails can be answered with a short reply, generating three example responses, and enabling users to send one with a single tap. Initially only available on the Android and iOS mobile apps, Smart Reply was added to the Inbox website in March 2016, along with Google announcing that "10% of all your replies on mobile already use Smart Reply".

In April 2016, Google updated Inbox with three new features; Google Calendar event organization, newsletter previews, and a "Save to Inbox" functionality that lets users save links for later use rather than having to email links to themselves.

In December 2017, Google introduced an "Unsubscribe" card that lets users easily unsubscribe from mailing lists. The card appears for email messages from specific senders that the user hasn't opened for a month.

A few popular Inbox by Gmail features have since been added to Gmail:
 Snoozing emails
 Nudges: This means that Gmail moves old messages back to the top of ones inbox when it thinks you might want to follow up or reply.
 Hover actions: This means that one can put the mouse cursor over a message and quickly take actions like archiving without opening the email.
 Smart reply: This feature shows suggested phrases for some emails to quickly reply.

Google reportedly said that they eventually also want to add the bundles feature to Gmail, which currently is only available in Inbox for Gmail, but that they don't have a timeline for that.

By March 2020, many Inbox features were still missing from Gmail.

Platforms 
Inbox by Gmail was announced in limited invitation-only basis on October 22, 2014, available on the web, and through the Android and iOS mobile operating systems. It was officially released to the public on May 28, 2015.

Reception 
David Pierce of The Verge praised the service, writing that it's "minimalist and lovely, full of layers and easy to navigate. It's remarkably fast and smooth on all platforms, and far better on iOS than the Gmail app". However, he criticized the app's low density of information, writing that only a few emails are visible on the screen at a time, making it "a bit of a challenge" for users who need to go through "hundreds of emails" every day. Although positive that "Inbox feels a lot like the future of email", Pierce wrote that there's "plenty of algorithm tweaking and design condensing to do", with particular attention towards a "compact view" for denser view of information on the screen.

Sarah Mitroff of CNET also praised Inbox, writing; "Not only is it visually appealing, it's also full of features that help you find every message you need, when you need it". She added that users must "give up the control" to organize their email, adding that "won't vibe with everyone", but admitting that "if you're willing ... the app will reward you with smarter and cleaner inbox." Mitroff did note that, initially, users must coach the app about which bundle is appropriate for some emails, writing that "It's a tedious process at first,  in just a few days Inbox starts to get it right." Regarding any downsides of the service, Mitroff wrote that "Inbox has a built-in strategy for managing your emails that works best on its own. Anyone who already has a system for organizing their emails will likely find themselves fighting Google's system".

Discontinuation and legacy

Google ended the service in March 2019. Google called Inbox "a great place to experiment with new ideas" and noted that many of those ideas had now migrated to Gmail. The company said that going forward, it wanted to focus its resources on a single email system.

References

External links 
 

Android (operating system) software
Discontinued Google services
Discontinued Google software
Email clients
Gmail
Google software
Internet properties established in 2014
IOS software
Web applications
2014 establishments in California